Academic ranks are the titles, relative importance and power of professors, researchers and administrative personnel held in academia.

At higher education institutions in Thailand, teaching officers are generally called "lecturers" (อาจารย์ achan) and are collectively called "teaching staff" (คณาจารย์ khanachan), whilst administrative officers are generally called "administrators" (ผู้บริหาร phuborihan) and are collectively called "administrative staff" (คณะผู้บริหาร khana phuborihan).

Careers of teaching staff at Thai universities generally start at the level of "lecturer". At this level, contracts may be permanent or temporary, or may impose a time-limit for progression to a higher rank (similarly to a US tenure-track position). In order to achieve higher academic ranks, staff must submit to evaluation both internally (at the level of their institution) and externally (by academics from other institutions). Criteria for promotion are regulated centrally by the body which regulates universities (Office of the Higher Education Commission), meaning that there is little variation in promotion standards across institutions, irrespective of their status or orientation (e.g. research-intensive international universities vs. teaching-oriented local universities).

Progression of staff through academic ranks follows a similar dynamic to that in Australia, with the highest rank of Professor awarded selectively to leading scholars. Thus, compared to higher education institutions in countries such as the US, where Associate Professor is regarded as a mid-career rank and an intermediate step before Professorship, holders of Associate Professorships are regarded as senior members of academic staff at Thai universities, comparable to Readers at many Commonwealth institutions.

Academic ranks

Professors

Others

Administrative ranks

References

Academic ranks
Academia in Thailand